"Angels in the Sky" is a popular song by Dick Glasser. It was published in 1954 and has been recorded by a number of artists. The first recording was by Glasser himself and was issued on Jack Gale's label, Triple A (#2522), flipped with "Is It Too Late?", another Glasser composition. In 1954, Gale would strike a deal with RCA Victor for the song and it was then recorded and released by Tony Martin on RCA Victor #5757 about August 1954, flipped with "Boulevard Of Nightingales". A part of the deal was that Glasser's recording would be withdrawn from the market.

The biggest hit for the song would happen later in the following year with a version by The Crew-Cuts on Mercury Records #70741. It first reached the Billboard charts on December 17, 1955. On the Disk Jockey chart, it peaked at #16; on the Best Seller chart, at #11; on the Juke Box chart, at #13; on the composite chart of the top 100 songs, it reached #13. The flip side was "Mostly Martha".

Dick Glasser re-recorded the song after having signed with Columbia Records by Autumn 1958. It was released as his third single for the label (#41357) about March 1959, this time flipped with "Get Thee Behind Me".

Recorded versions
Dick Glasser (1953); (1959)
 Buddy Cunningham (1954)
Tony Martin (1954)
 The Van Cleaf Sisters (1954)
 Herb & Kay (1954)
The Crew Cuts (1955)
 The Monarchs (1955)
Artie Malvin (1956)
Gene Autry (1956)
Bobby Vee (1960)
Gene McDaniels (1961)
Walter Brennan (1962)
Glen Campbell (1970)

External links
 Song lyric

1954 songs
Songs written by Dick Glasser